René Dumesnil (19 June 1879 – 24 December 1967) was a French physician, literary critic and musicologist.

Dumesnil studied literature at the Sorbonne and became a literary critic. Then he was music critic for Le Mercure de France and Le Monde.

He was elected a member of the Académie des beaux-arts in 1965. In addition to his publications in literature (numerous studies on Flaubert, Maupassant and realism, he has written a number of books on music. Dumesnil won four prizes awarded by the Académie française.

Publications 
His writings were published in Paris (unless otherwise stated).

Critics and literary history 
1912: Autour de Flaubert, (in collaboration with René Descharmes)
1928: En marge de Flaubert
1928: La publication de Madame Bovary
1931: La publication d'En Route, by J.-K. Huysmans
1932: Gustave Flaubert, l'homme et l'œuvre
1933: La publication des Soirées de Médan
1936: L'Éducation Sentimentale de Gustave Flaubert
1939: Bibliographie de Gustave Flaubert, (in collaboration with D.-L. Demorest)
1945: La Vie littéraire et l'Époque réaliste et naturaliste
1945: Le grand amour de Flaubert
1947: Guy de Maupassant, l'homme et l'œuvre
1955: Le Réalisme et le Naturalisme

Musical critic 
1921: Le Rythme musical; 2nd ed. augmented, 1949
1924: Le Monde des musiciens
1927: Le Don Juan de Mozart ; 2nd ed. augmented, 1955
1928: Musiciens romantiques
1929: Richard Wagner
1930: La Musique contemporaine en France ; 2nd ed. augmented 1949
1931: Le Livre du disque — with P. Hemarinquer
1934: Histoire illustrée de la musique
1936: Portraits de musiciens français
1945: La Musique romantique en France
1946: La Musique en France entre les deux guerres — Geneva
1949: L'Envers de la musique
1953: Histoire illustrée du théâtre lyrique ; Grand prix de la littérature musicale
1954: Richard Wagner, a more important work than the one published in 1929
1964: L'Opéra
1965: Mozart présent dans ses œuvres lyriques — Brussels
 Histoire de la musique des origines à nos jours — with Jules Combarieu — 5 volumes, Armand Colin

Essays, history 
1929: Supplément aux Ridicules du Temps, de Barbey d'Aurevilly
1935: La Seine normande
1936: Histoire illustrée de la Médecine
1938: L'Âme du Médecin

Novels and tales 
1919: L'Absence
1924: Quatre histoires couleur des saisons

Bibliography 
 Dictionnaire bibliographique des musiciens — Éditions Robert Laffont
 G. Van der Kemp: Notice sur la vie et les travaux de René Dumesnil (1970)

External links 
 René Dumesnil on Encyclopédie Larousse
 Une lettre inédite de René Dumesnil à Marcel Proust du 19 janvier 1920
 Obituary of René Dumesnil
  Guy de Maupassant : René Dumesnil (compte rendu) on Persée
 René Dumesnil on the site of the Académie française

1879 births
1967 deaths
20th-century French musicologists
French literary critics
French music critics
Physicians from Rouen
Writers from Rouen
Winners of the Prix Broquette-Gonin (literature)